Jack Clement Badcock was an English historian, naturalist, columnist, writer and painter who lived in the village of Fleckney, Leicestershire.

For many years Badcock wrote a regular naturalist column for the Leicester Mercury newspaper and also produced a number of books on the subject, including 'In the Countryside of South Leicestershire' (1972) and "A Countryman's Calendar" (1973).

Badcock was also the first person to write a history of the village of Fleckney in 1951, and also wrote a fictional trilogy of books with a rustic theme entitled, 'The Truants' (1953), 'Waybent' (1954') and 'The Four-Acre' (1967).

Due to the lengthy incumbency of the Reverend Thomas Badcock at Fleckney Parish Church in the nineteenth century, there has been an assumption that the two were related, though in fact, they were from entirely different families.

In recent times, Badcock has been commemorated in his native village, with the naming of 'Badcock Way', at the entrance to the Saddington Grange Estate, on Saddington Road.

External links 
 Article at the South Fleckney History Group

20th-century English historians
English naturalists
English columnists
20th-century English painters
English male painters
People from Harborough District
20th-century English male artists